Loyd Remi Johansen (born July 25, 1987) is an ice sledge hockey player from Norway. Also known as Loyd Remi Pallander Solberg, he was on the silver medal-winning team at the 2006 Winter Paralympics, as well as the bronze medal-winning team at the 2010 Winter Paralympics.

References

External links 
 

1987 births
Living people
Norwegian sledge hockey players
Paralympic sledge hockey players of Norway
Paralympic silver medalists for Norway
Paralympic bronze medalists for Norway
Ice sledge hockey players at the 2006 Winter Paralympics
Ice sledge hockey players at the 2010 Winter Paralympics
Medalists at the 2006 Winter Paralympics
Medalists at the 2010 Winter Paralympics
Paralympic medalists in sledge hockey